is a passenger railway station on the Keisei Main Line in the city of Ichikawa, Chiba Japan, operated by the private railway operator Keisei Electric Railway.

Lines
Ichikawamama Station is served by the Keisei Main Line, and is located 17.3 km from the terminus of the line at Keisei-Ueno Station.

Layout
The station consists of two ground-level island platforms serving four tracks, with station building located over the platforms.

Platforms

History
It was renamed in June 1916.

Station numbering was introduced to all Keisei Line stations on 17 June 2010. Ichikawamama was assigned station number KS14.

Passenger statistics
In fiscal 2019, the station was used by an average of 7258 passengers daily.

Surrounding area
 Konodai Girls' High School Elementary School / Junior High School / High School
 Hide Gakuen High School
 Hide Gakuen Junior High School
 Hinode Gakuen Elementary School

See also
 List of railway stations in Japan

References

External links

 Keisei Station information 

Railway stations in Chiba Prefecture
Keisei Main Line
Railway stations in Japan opened in 1914
Ichikawa, Chiba